Kaiyum Thalayum Purathidaruthe is a 1985 Indian Malayalam film, directed by P. Sreekumar. The film stars Mukesh, Devan, Sabitha Anand and Sukumari in the lead roles. The film has musical score by Raveendran. The film based on famous drama of K.P.A.C written by Thoppil Bhasi as same title

Cast

Mukesh as Passenger
Devan as Mahadevan
Sabitha Anand as Passenger
Sukumari as Narayani
Nedumudi Venu as Secretary
Shubha as Leela
Bharath Gopi as Conductor 
Cochin Haneefa as Maneesh
James as Passenger
Kothuku Nanappan as President
Kunjandi as Politician
Kuthiravattam Pappu as Appu
Lalithasree as Gouri
Nellikode Bhaskaran as Kittummavan
Poojappura Radhakrishnan as Passenger
Poojappura Ravi as Police 
Ragini as Sudha 
Rajam K. Nair as Leela's mother
Rasheed as Police Inspector
Santhakumari as Sharada
Thodupuzha Vasanthi as Vanitha Member

Soundtrack
The music was composed by Raveendran and the lyrics were written by Mullanezhi and Poovachal Khader.

References

External links
 

1985 films
1980s Malayalam-language films